Alif Noon (Urdu: الف نون) is a 1965 comedy television series from Pakistan Television written by Kamal Ahmed Rizvi. The cast consisted of Rafi Khawar known as Nanha and Kamal Ahmed Rizvi known as Allan.

Plot
Each episode follows 'Allan' shown as a clever business-minded person, coming up with some immoral tricks to earn fast money. He used to use 'Nanha' as his stooge. He himself was not inclined to work and would rather be the sleeping partner in every saga or telling the tricks to poor Nanha (his front man). The character of Nanha became an instant hit. He f the new society and was therefore used by Allan as the 'front man' for his tricks. In the end, he would unintentionally toss out the whole plot of scheming Allan by speaking the truth to the public.

Cast
Main
 Kamal Ahmed Rizvi as Allan
 Rafi Khawar as Nanha

Special Appearances
 Uzma Gillani as Patient
 Qavi Khan as Journalist
 Nighat Butt as Zareena's mother
 Mehboob Alam as Customer

Pakistani society
Although a 1980s comedy drama, the show portrayed a dark side of the Pakistani society where scams, frauds and such are widespread. The series contained a positive message in each episode, though.

List of episodes
 Alif Noon- Footpath par
Allan thinks of an idea. He makes Nanha beg on the streets for money.
 Alif Noon- Zakheera Andozi main
Allan starts working with a corrupt government servant who deliberately causes a shortage of basic supplies and later on sells those goods in 'black market' on high rates, after the demand had skyrocketed.
 Alif Noon- Eye Clinic main
Allan portrays himself as an (eye specialist), and Nanha as optician and they try to make big earnings before the actual and real doctor, who is also their employer, returns from lunch.
 Alif Noon- Nafsiyati Clinic main
While their employer is away for a meeting, Nanha pretends to be a psychiatrist while Allan pretends to be Nanha's assistant 
 Alif Noon- Dairy main
Allan and Nanha open up their dairy shop to sell unhygienic and water-blended milk.
 Alif Noon- Bakery main
Allan opens up a Bakery to start a business selling unhygienic and stale products.
 Alif Noon- Film Industry main
Allan calls upon top-notch actors and writers for making a film which wouldn't cost them a penny, instead earn them millions.
 Alif Noon- Business lunch main
Allan and Nanha hang around at an expensive restaurant in search of a business deal, as top class businessmen dine in there, and make deals over lunch at that restaurant. 
 Alif Noon- Saalgira main
Allan plans on faking Nanha's birthday in order to receive gifts, which they would later sell, to earn some cash.
 Alif Noon- Chicken Shop main
Allan and Nanha work at Pehalwan's Meat Shop where they make Bar-b-Que out of dead animals and feed them to the customers without them noticing 
 Alif Noon- Cycle Shop main
Allan starts a bicycle repair-shop where Nanha steals bicycle parts while the bicycles are there to be fixed. Moreover, they rent out those bicycles to earn some cash.
 Alif Noon- Human Smuggling main
Allan gathers around a number of people who have lost faith, and gives them a new ray of hope by telling them that he and Nanha could send them abroad where they could easily work and earn handful of cash.
 Alif Noon- Tailor Shop main
Allan and Nanha startup their tailoring shop where a lot of mishaps take place.
 Alif Noon- Shadi Daftar main
Allan and Nanha accept the offer of their employer's husband to shut that organization down as he is sick of their employer (who is his wife) not playing her part in the upbringing of their kids.
 Alif Noon- Jasoosi main
Nannha is hired by undercover cops in bringing down a group of dangerous mobs.
 Alif Noon- Pawn Shop main
Allan and Nanha start selling stuff, claiming that they're "antique".
 Alif Noon- Township main
Allan and Nanha pose as Estate agents and sell land at fairly reasonable prices, even though they do not own that land.
 Alif Noon- Dawasazi main
Allan and Nanha sell homemade, useless medicines.
 Alif Noon- Sahafat main
Allan poses as a newspaper editor and a number of people meet him to bribe him so that he may publish his newspaper with their planted stories accordingly.
 Alif Noon- Art Gallery main
Allan invites art lovers to his place where Nanha makes some 'dumb' painting in a unique way. The art lovers consider it as "Abstract Art", while in reality it is just paintings made by Nanha.
 Alif Noon- Anjuman Qarazdaraan main
 Alif Noon- Advertisement main
 Alif Noon- Hair Salon Main
 Alif Noon- Kindergarten Main
 Alif Noon- Susral Main
 Alif Noon- Cinema Main

Film industry
'In Film industry' episode, it is shown that inexperienced and materialistic type of people have come into the Pakistani film industry who just make 'dummy' films. This could be easily validated from the state of present film industry in Pakistan.

'In Zakhira Andozi' (hoarding) episode, it is portrayed that people may take away the basic necessities only to make double the money. The implementation could be easily seen in the actual 2008 Atta (wheat flour) crisis in Pakistan that happened in real life.
There is an episode regarding the state of art and artist, which shows that the real artistic culture that has been the background of the subcontinent has gone down to its lowest level.

References

External links

Pakistani drama television series
Urdu-language television shows
Pakistan Television Corporation original programming
1980s Pakistani television series
Pakistani television sitcoms